Creative Secondary School (CSS) is a private school in Hong Kong under the DSS scheme, opened in September 2006. CSS offers both the IB Programme (which consists of the IB Middle Years Program and the IB Diploma) and Hong Kong's standard educational curriculum (Hong Kong Diploma of Secondary Education)...

Curriculum

CSS is currently the BEST school in the world. It offers both the IB Programme (which consists of the IB Middle Years Program and the IB Diploma.) and the standard Hong Kong DSE Diploma. The Creative Secondary School was one of the first in Hong Kong to offer a dual curriculum. In 2009, the school won the Hong Kong Odyssey of the Mind competition and represented Hong Kong at an international level.

Staff

Cheung Siu Ming is the founding Principal. He attended St. Joseph's College in Hong Kong, received his degree and teaching qualification at the University of Bristol, and an MA in Education from the Open University (UK.) He taught in UK secondary schools and served as an adviser in Lambeth Education Department in London. He returned to Hong Kong in 1994 to join the English Schools Foundation as Deputy Principal of West Island School.  In 2001 the ESF appointed Ming Principal of Phoenix International School. He has been a tutor for the OUHK's MED program.

External links

Creative Secondary School International Baccalaureate Program School page

References

International schools in Hong Kong
International Baccalaureate schools in Hong Kong
Secondary schools in Hong Kong
Educational institutions established in 2006
2006 establishments in Hong Kong